Snow Queen is a World Cup alpine ski race held in the hills of Zagreb, Croatia. The men's and women's slalom races take place on the Medvednica mountaintop Sljeme, just north of Zagreb, usually in early January. The women's race debuted in 2005 and the men's event was added three years later in 2008. Besides the city events in Moscow and Munich, it is the only World Cup event held near a large metropolitan area.

Its current prize fund of €120,000 is one of the largest on the World Cup circuit, with a winner's share of €46,000. The race has been known to attract up to 25,000 spectators, making it one of the largest and the most visited races on the World Cup calendar. The trophy is a crystal crown with past winners' names imprinted on it. At the award ceremony, the winner is presented with a cloak and sits on a throne like a queen (king).

History
The race was originally called "Golden Bear", but from the 2006 event the name was changed in honor of Janica Kostelić, whose victories in the sport helped popularise skiing in Croatia and also paved the way for the race to be included in the premier competition for alpine skiing. Croatian skiers never finished better than second in the event. In the women's race, Janica Kostelić finished third in 2006, while Ana Jelušić finished second the following year. In the men's race Ivica Kostelić has four podium finishes, three second places and one third place. The all-time leader at Zagreb in women's event is Mikaela Shiffrin, with five wins and seven podium finishes. Marcel Hirscher has won five races in the men's event.

In 2013, Mikaela Shiffrin became the youngest winner at the age of 17 years, 9 months, and 23 days. In 2014, the race was cancelled due to lack of snow. Shiffrin, reigning Olympic champion in slalom, defended her crown in 2015.  The following year, both races were  again cancelled due to lack of snow.

Results

Podium finishers in the slalom races.

Men's race

Women's race

List of multiple podium finishers

References

External links

Skiing competitions in Europe
International sports competitions hosted by Croatia
Alpine skiing competitions
Sport in Zagreb
Recurring sporting events established in 2005
January sporting events
Alpine skiing in Croatia
Winter events in Croatia